Michael Schluter may refer to:
Michael Schluter (economist) (born 1947), American economist
Michael Schluter, organizer of the political activist group Keep Sunday Special